Siltanen & Partners is an American advertising agency, located in El Segundo, California. The company was founded by Rob Siltanen in 1999, following his departure from TBWA/Chiat/Day.

Major Clients

Siltanen & Partners has produced work for a variety of clients, including Nissan, Apple Inc., Levi Strauss & Co, the International Olympic Committee, FreeInternet.com, Tellme Networks, Round Table Pizza, Rubio's Coastal Grill, EA Sports, Skechers, Amazon, Coldwell Banker, Suzuki, Panda Express, VTech, Togo's, Pei Wei Asian Kitchen.

Notable Campaigns

Apple – “To The Crazy Ones” 

Rob Siltanen's "To the Crazy Ones" manifesto launched "Think Different", a campaign for Apple that went on to become a hallmark of modern advertising. The campaign won the 2000 Grand Effie Award for the most effective advertising in America and the spot won the Emmy Award for best commercial in 1998.

Nissan – “Toys” 

"Toys" remains one of the most highly awarded car commercials in history. It was named commercial of the year by TIME, Rolling Stone, USA Today, and Adweek.

Amazon – “Kindle Fire” and “Kindle Fire HD” 

Siltanen's Kindle Fire campaign was ranked as the #1 most effective mobile technology advertising of 2013 by Ace Metrix. Their efforts would again top the tech category in 2015, when marketing its successor, the Kindle Fire HD.

Coldwell Banker – “This is Home” and “Homes for Dogs” 

Siltanen and Partner's has represented real-estate company Coldwell Banker since 2011. A prominent television and digital campaign aired in 2016, entitled "This is Home" featuring user generated photos and video.

Since 2015, Homes for Dogs has been an annual initiative in partnership between Coldwell Banker and Adopt-a-Pet.com to find homes for shelter animals. Ace Metrix, an advertising analytics company, scored Siltanen & Partners's 2017 commercial, “Somebody to Love”, as the highest rated real estate ad of all time.

In 2018, Coldwell Banker and Siltanen celebrated the fourth consecutive year partnering with Adopt-a-Pet.com with “Old Dog, New Dog”. The ad received the highest rating in the real estate ad category in 2018 and earned top marks for likeability. Only behind “Somebody to Love”, it is the second highest rated real estate ad ever.

Skechers – “Performance Division” 

Siltanen & Partners was named agency of record for Skechers in 2012. Siltanen & Partners launched the Skechers Performance Division, featuring standout Super Bowl commercials in 2012 and 2013. The work for Skechers has earned industry praise, placing the company on Ad Age's 2015 Marketer A-List.

References

Advertising agencies of the United States
Marketing companies established in 1999
1999 establishments in California